Pancé (Gallo: Panczaé) is a commune in the Ille-et-Vilaine department of Brittany in northwestern France.

Geography
The river Semnon forms all of the commune's southern border.

Population
Inhabitants of Pancé are called Pancéens in French.

See also
Communes of the Ille-et-Vilaine department

References

External links

Mayors of Ille-et-Vilaine Association 

Communes of Ille-et-Vilaine